Natasha Fisher is an aboriginal Canadian singer, songwriter, and producer from Thunder Bay, who resides in Toronto.

Early life 
Natasha Fisher was born to parents Anita and Roma Fisher, who are senior pastors at Faith City Church in Thunder Bay, where Fisher first sang as a child.
She began taking vocal lessons at age 14.
The Fishers are members of the Long Lake 58 First Nation,
an Ojibwe First Nation located in Northern Ontario.
Natasha Fisher sometimes sings with her sister, Hannah Fisher, performing together as the Fisher Sisters.
Classic Roots, Fisher's cousin, is an electronica and pow wow techno musician.

Career
After living in Thunder Bay until she was 18, Fisher moved to Toronto to advance her music career.  
She describes her sound as Aboriginal-influenced electronic pop R&B.
She has covered  different genres including hip hop and R&B.
She says her Ojibwe heritage is an influence for her music.

In 2017, she released her original song Lie To Me off of her debut album Her. The video for Lie To Me was recorded by Spun Creative and includes shots from Mount McKay and the surrounding area. The album depicts a young woman moving from a familiar home town, moving to a large city, leaving all the things she knows behind.
A relationship breakup forms the basis of different songs on the album.

Fisher has periodically toured with Classic Roots, performing at schools, and some northern Ontario First Nation communities.

In October of 2019 Natasha released her first single off of her debut LP "Millennial" and on December 13th, 2019 Natasha released "Millennial" presented by the Ontario Arts Council. The LP contains 8 tracks and is currently available in physical format at natashafisher.com. In 2020, Natasha released 5 singles from her LP, digitally. Her release "Never Ever" was featured on thisis50.com and landed on Audiomack's RnB Trending, and Hometown Heroes: Toronto Playlist. />

References

External links
Official website

Musicians from Thunder Bay
Living people
Canadian women singer-songwriters
Canadian singer-songwriters
First Nations women
First Nations musicians
Ojibwe people
Year of birth missing (living people)